Roger Lynch (born October 24, 1962) is the chief executive officer of Condé Nast. Since joining Condé Nast in 2019, Lynch has been responsible for integrating the media company's U.S. and international businesses.

Early life 
Lynch spent much of his childhood in Baltimore, Maryland, where he had his first job at the age of 10 delivering newspapers. He studied at Loyola Blakefield in Baltimore.

He attended the University of Southern California and received a Bachelor of Science in physics. After graduation, he spent time working in aerospace and defense before enrolling at the Tuck School of Business for an MBA, where he graduated with highest distinction. After earning his MBA, he started working in technology investment banking at Morgan Stanley.

Career 
In 1999, Lynch was named president and CEO of Chello Broadband in Amsterdam, after which he became chairman and CEO of Video Networks International Ltd., an IPTV provider based in the United Kingdom.

Lynch joined Dish Networks in 2009, where he became the founding CEO of Sling TV, overseeing the platform's launch in 2015.  

In 2017, Lynch was named president and CEO of Pandora, where he led the music streaming service to accelerated revenue growth and positive returns. Pandora was sold to Sirius XM in February 2019.

Lynch became CEO of Condé Nast in April 2019. In his first eight months, the company launched new editions of its titles in several countries around the world and made public commitments to reduce its environmental impact. Lynch also established a new global leadership team charged with helping the business expand worldwide, and in December 2020, he unveiled the company's new global content strategy.

Lynch is a member of the board of directors for Condé Nast, Mattel, the board of advisors at the Tuck School at Dartmouth College and the board of councilors at the Dornsife College of Letters, Arts and Sciences at the University of Southern California.

Personal life 
Lynch lives with his wife in New York. He has three children and two grandchildren. He plays the lead guitar in an all-CEO rock band. In addition to his home in New York City, he has a home in Lake Arrowhead, California.

References

External links 
Corporate biography

Living people
People from Baltimore
1962 births